Kanganpur , is a city in Kasur District in the Punjab province of Pakistan. It is part of Chunian Tehsil and is located at 30°46'0N 74°7'60E  with an altitude of 177 metres (583 feet).

References
Person

Populated places in Kasur District